Oreonectes microphthalmus is a species of troglobitic stone loach. This cavefish is found only in Guangxi in China. It grows to  standard length.

References

microphthalmus
Freshwater fish of China
Endemic fauna of Guangxi
Cave fish
Fish described in 2008